Between Men may refer to:
 Between Men (1935 film), an American Western film
 Between Men (1916 film), an American silent Western film